Susana Andrade (born 9 February 1963) is a Uruguayan procurator, journalist, columnist, Umbanda religious figure, and politician.

Biography
Susana Andrade was born in Montevideo and has eight siblings. She has been a columnist for the newspaper La República since 2004. She belongs to Broad Front Space List 711.

Andrade has been known as Mae Susana de Oxum in the Umbanda religion since 1991. She is the first Afro-Umbandan to hold the office of Deputy of the Republic. She is the founder of the Atabaque Group.

In 2008 she participated in the project Dueños de la encrucijada, analyzing Afro-Brazilian religious rites.

In 2015, she presented her book Mima Kumba, which deals with the "difficulties of social insertion of an Afro-Brazilian and Afro-descendant religious social militant woman." The author aggregated verses, thoughts, and her own writings.

She married Julio Kronberg, with whom she has two children, Germán and Naomi Kronberg Andrade.

Books
 2008, Dueños de la Encrucijada (collaborator)
 2009, Entre la religión y la política
 2015, Mima Kumba y otros encantos negros
 2018, Resiliencia Africana

References

External links

 

1963 births
Broad Front (Uruguay) politicians
Living people
Members of the Chamber of Representatives of Uruguay
Politicians from Montevideo
University of the Republic (Uruguay) alumni
Uruguayan columnists
Uruguayan women columnists
21st-century Uruguayan women politicians
21st-century Uruguayan politicians